The Race Equality Directive 2000/43/EC is a legal act of the European Union, concerning European labour law. It implements the principle of equal treatment between persons irrespective of racial or ethnic group. Since the Treaty of Amsterdam came into force in 1999, new EC laws, or Directives, have been enacted in the area of anti-discrimination, and this directive complements other directives on gender and age, disability, religion and sexual orientation.

Overview
The principle rules laid down are as follows:

 Implements the principle of equal treatment between people irrespective of racial or ethnic origin.
 Gives protection against discrimination in employment and training, education, social protection (including social security and healthcare), social advantages, membership and involvement in organisations of workers and employers and access to goods and services, including housing.
 Contains definitions of direct and indirect discrimination and harassment and prohibits the instruction to discriminate and victimisation.
 Allows for positive action measures to be taken, in order to ensure full equality in practice.
 Gives victims of discrimination a right to make a complaint through a judicial or administrative procedure, associated with appropriate penalties for those who discriminate.
 Allows for limited exceptions to the principle of equal treatment, for example in cases where a difference in treatment on the ground of race or ethnic origin constitutes a genuine occupational requirement.
 Shares the burden of proof between the complainant and the respondent in civil and administrative cases, so that once an alleged victim establishes facts from which it may be presumed that there has been discrimination, it is for the respondent to prove that there has been no breach of the equal treatment principle.
 Provides for the establishment in each Member State of an organisation to promote equal treatment and provide independent assistance to victims of racial discrimination.

See also

EU law
EU labour law
UK labour law
Equality Act 2010
List of European Union directives

References

External links
Text of the directive 
Protecting fundamental rights within the Union
European Commission > Employment, Social Affairs and Equal Opportunities > Tackling discrimination

2000 in law
2000 in the European Union
Anti-discrimination law in the European Union
Anti-racism in Europe
European Union directives
European Union employment directives